The 2011 CSL season was the 14th season in York Region Shooters participation in the Canadian Soccer League. The club ended their CSL campaign by securing the final postseason berth in the First Division. In the postseason York Region defeated division champions SC Toronto in the preliminary round, but were eliminated from the competition in the following round to Toronto Croatia. While in the Second Division their reserve team clinched a playoff berth after finishing third in the East Conference standings. Kadian Lecky was Vaughan's top goalscorer for the sixth consecutive time scoring a personal record of 15 goals.

Summary  
The managerial structure remained intact with Filipe Bento resuming his coaching duties for the 2011 season. The roster assembled by Bento consisted of the traditional group of veteran core players with a few additions of CSL veterans and talent from abroad. Near the conclusion of the season Bento was replaced by former league veteran Brian Bowes. Throughout the season York Region struggled to achieve sufficient results, but managed to secure the final playoff berth after finishing eighth in the standings. Their postseason performance saw the club defeat First Division champions SC Toronto in the opening rounds, but in the second round the Shooters were eliminated from the competition after a defeat to Toronto Croatia.

Meanwhile in the Second Division their reserve team clinched a playoff berth after finishing third in the East Conference standings. While in the management staff the club lost the services of veteran club official Ruben Toro due to surgery complications from pneumonia. Toro was a notable member of the Brampton Hitmen team staff that won the 2005 CPSL Championship.

Club

Management

Squad
As of October 5, 2011.

Transfers

In

Out

Competitions summary

Regular season

First division

Results summary

Results by round

Matches

Postseason

Statistics

Goals 
Correct as of October 5, 2011

References

York Region Shooters
York Region Shooters
York Region Shooters seasons